Thomas J. Murray House, also known as Rice Place, is a historic home located near Mars Hill, Madison County, North Carolina.  It was built about 1894, and is a two-story, three-bay, single-pile frame I-house.  It has a side-gabled roof, is set on a rubble stone-pier foundation, and has a full-width shed roofed front porch.  Also on the property are the contributing gable-roofed livestock barn and a large gambrel roofed tobacco barn.

It was listed on the National Register of Historic Places in 2005.

References

Houses on the National Register of Historic Places in North Carolina
Houses completed in 1894
Houses in Madison County, North Carolina
National Register of Historic Places in Madison County, North Carolina